Colaspidea is a genus of leaf beetles in the subfamily Eumolpinae. It is known from North America (California and the southwestern United States) and the Mediterranean. It has recently been suggested that the Mediterranean species of Colaspidea are a sister genus to Chalcosicya, and that Colaspina forms a sister genus to the former two combined. It has also been suggested that the North American species of Colaspidea may represent a separate genus.

The North American species of Colaspidea have wings, while the Mediterranean species are wingless.

Species
There are 19 described species in the genus Colaspidea:

Mediterranean species:
 Colaspidea algarvensis Zoia, 2014
 Colaspidea confinis Zoia, 2014
 Colaspidea dogueti Zoia, 2014
 Colaspidea globosa (Küster, 1848) g
 Colaspidea graeca Zoia, 2014
 Colaspidea grossa Fairmaire, 1866 g
 Colaspidea incerta Zoia, 2014
 Colaspidea inflata Lefèvre, 1876
 Colaspidea juengeri Doguet, 1988 (formerly a subspecies of C. metallica)
 Colaspidea maghrebina Zoia, 2014
 Colaspidea maura Zoia, 2014
 Colaspidea metallica (Rossi, 1790) g
 Colaspidea oblonga (Blanchard, 1845) g (synonyms: C. nitida H. Lucas, 1846; C. oblonga (Fairmaire, 1862); C. oblonga albanica Schatzmayr, 1923)
 Colaspidea ovulum Fairmaire, 1866
 Colaspidea pallidipes Zoia, 2014
 Colaspidea proxima (Fairmaire, 1862) g

North American species:
 Colaspidea pallipes Fall, 1933 i c g
 Colaspidea pomonae Fall, 1933 i c g
 Colaspidea smaragdula (LeConte, 1857) i c g b

Data sources: i = ITIS, c = Catalogue of Life, g = GBIF, b = BugGuide

References

Further reading

External links

 

Eumolpinae
Chrysomelidae genera
Articles created by Qbugbot
Beetles of North America
Beetles of Europe
Taxa named by François-Louis Laporte, comte de Castelnau